is a Japanese television series, the 39th entry of Toei's long-running Super Sentai metaseries, following Ressha Sentai ToQger. It is the third ninja-based Sentai, and the fourth to be based on Japanese mythology and culture (after Samurai Sentai Shinkenger) and premiered on February 22, 2015, joining Kamen Rider Drive, and later, Kamen Rider Ghost in the Super Hero Time line-up on TV Asahi affiliate stations, until concluding on February 7, 2016. Ninninger also serves as the 40th anniversary of the franchise. The lead screenwriter for the series is Kento Shimoyama and Kousuke Yamashita serves as the series' composer. Its footage is used for the American Power Rangers season, Power Rangers Ninja Steel and its follow-up season, Power Rangers Super Ninja Steel.

The cast were introduced to the public at a special event at Tokyo Dome City on January 24 and 25, 2015. The characters themselves debuted in the film, Ressha Sentai ToQger vs. Kyoryuger: The Movie.

Ninninger began airing in South Korea as Power Rangers Ninja Force.

Story

Centuries ago, the ruthless feudal warlord Gengetsu Kibaoni was slain by the Igasaki Ninja clan, before discarding his humanity to become a Yokai. In his first attempt to rise again, Kibaoni was defeated and sealed by Yoshitaka Igasaki, a man known as the Last Ninja, but three generations later, Kibaoni is unsealed by his retainer Kyuemon Izayoi. As only members of Igasaki's bloodline can stop the rampaging Yokai, Yoshitaka's son Tsumuji Igasaki assembles the Ninningers, composed of his children Takaharu and Fuka and their cousins Yakumo Kato, Nagi Matsuo, and Kasumi Momochi, to master their clan's  and fight the Kibaoni Army Corps. The team is later joined by Kinji Takigawa, a Yokai Hunter from the United States who becomes Yoshitaka's disciple after earning his trust. Also, according to their grandfather, one among them will be chosen to inherit the title of Last Ninja, and become the guardian of the Igasaki family's ultimate treasure, the "End Shuriken", which is also coveted by the Kibaoni Corps in their plan to revive their master and take over the world by fear.

Development

The trademark for the series was filed by Toei Company on September 25, 2014.

TV Asahi producer Chihiro Inoue brought up three ideas at the show's premiere conference. First was that they will continue to make Super Sentai fun and entertaining for children by keeping the same colorful action scenes, but they will use traditional Japanese musical themes such as those found in festival music. The second point was a desire to raise the agelessness of the series by including Toshihiro Yashiba and Takashi Sasano in the cast so adults and grandparents can enjoy the show with their children and grandchildren. The third point is that the supporting staff are all enthusiastic about the series. Inoue also wanted fans new and old to watch for the April 5, 2015 broadcast of the show (which has since been pushed back to April 12 due to Ninninger'''s premiere being pushed back a week) as he planned a special homage to Himitsu Sentai Gorenger, which premiered on April 5, 1975. The My Navi News reporter noted similarities between Gorenger and Ninninger, particularly how the Ninninger team members are named with Japanese color names rather than English. He also noted the prior ninja-themed Super Sentai Ninja Sentai Kakuranger and Ninpuu Sentai Hurricaneger, but felt that the story of Ninninger would be different.

Toei Company producer Naomi Takebe brought up the show's catchphrase being , explaining that they would be focusing on actual acrobatic ability in action scenes rather than relying on effects like wire work. She also brought up the nature of the series' robot, which has what initially appears to be a lack of unifying theme in its components: a humanoid robot, a dragon, a dump truck, a dog, and a train. She said that the Super Sentai series had long been keeping with these motifs in the robots, but the series' special effects director Hiroshi Butsuda had grown bored of these themes and felt the show would benefit from picking major themes from the franchise's past. Takebe also said that she hoped that the multiple components of the robot would be in line with the tenets of Cool Japan: the humanoid robot represents budō, the dog emphasizes "kawaii", the truck and train represent Japanese technology while the dragon, which is a European dragon, shows the influence on Japanese culture from abroad.

Episodes

Films
The Ninningers made their debut appearance in a scene from Ressha Sentai ToQger vs. Kyoryuger: The Movie.

Super Hero Taisen GP

Tetsuo Kurata, (Kamen Rider Black and Black RX), Yuichi Nakamura (Kamen Rider Den-O), Kousei Amano, Takayuki Tsubaki, Ryoji Morimoto and Takahiro Hojo (Kamen Rider Blade) and Kento Handa (Kamen Rider 555) reprise their roles in the film, which opened in theaters on March 21, 2015. A new actor, Mitsuhiro Oikawa, is confirmed to perform his role as Kamen Rider 3. The events of the movie take place between Shinobi 5 and 6.

The Dinosaur Lord's Splendid Ninja Scroll!
 
 was released in Japanese theaters on August 8, 2015, double-billed with the film for Kamen Rider Drive. The events of the movie take place between Shinobi 20 and 21.

Ninninger vs. ToQger

 was released in Japanese theaters on January 23, 2016, featuring the casts of both Ninninger and Ressha Sentai ToQger. The events of the movie take place between Shinobi 42 and 43.

Zyuohger vs. Ninninger

, is a feature film featuring a crossover between Ninninger and Doubutsu Sentai Zyuohger, released on January 14, 2017.

Ultra Super Hero Taisen
A crossover film, titled  featuring the casts of Kamen Rider Ex-Aid, Amazon Riders, Uchu Sentai Kyuranger, and Doubutsu Sentai Zyuohger, was released in Japan on March 25, 2017. This movie also celebrates the 10th anniversary of Kamen Rider Den-O and features the spaceship Andor Genesis from the Xevious game, which is used by the movie's main antagonists, as well as introduces the movie-exclusive Kamen Rider True Brave, played by Kamen Rider Brave's actor Toshiki Seto from Kamen Rider Ex-Aid, and the villain Shocker Great Leader III, played by the singer Diamond Yukai. In addition, individual actors from older Kamen Rider and Super Sentai TV series, Ryohei Odai (Kamen Rider Ryuki), Gaku Matsumoto (Shuriken Sentai Ninninger), Atsushi Maruyama (Zyuden Sentai Kyoryuger), and Hiroya Matsumoto (Tokumei Sentai Go-Busters'') reprise their respective roles.

Special DVD
 is a special DVD by Kodansha. Takaharu gets into an argument with Kinji over which of them has the better fashion sense before they come across Kamaitachi, Tsuchigumo, and Kappa with an army of Jukkarage, Dorodoro, and Magareppa that have all been revived from the magic of Hyakki Yagyō in daytime due to Kibaoni's influence. The two ninja proceed to transform to fight the Yokai, having a contest to see who can kill the most hellbound Yokai and their leader Gashadokuro. But the fight ultimately ends in a tie. The events of the specials take place between Shinobi 10 and 11.

V-Cinema

 is a direct-to-video film that was released on June 22, 2016. In the film's storyline, Fuka and Kasumi form a group called the Ninnin Girls and challenge their male teammates to a showdown. At the same time, Ariake no Kata, Mangetsu Kibaoni, and Juza Yumihari have revived and intend to take revenge on the ninjas. The events of the movie take place after the final episode of the series.

Cast
: 
: 
: 
: 
: 
: 
: 
: 
, : 
: 
: 
: 
: 
: 
: 
Narration, Ninninger Equipment Voice:

Guest stars

: 
: 
: 
: 
SILVER (25): SHIN (of CROSS GENE)
: 
: 
: 
Tourist (34): Yoshi Sudarso
: 
: 
:

Songs
Opening theme

Lyrics: 
Composition & Arrangement: 
Artist: 
Ending theme

Lyrics & Composition: 
Arrangement: Funta 7
Artist:

Notes

References

External links
 at TV Asahi(In Japanese)
 at Toei Company
 at Super-Sentai.net

Super Sentai
2015 Japanese television series debuts
2016 Japanese television series endings
Ninja fiction
Martial arts television series
Japanese comedy television series